Agrioglypta excelsalis is a moth in the family Crambidae described by Francis Walker in 1866. It is found on Sulawesi, Lifou Island, as well as in Bhutan, Thailand, Sumatra, Papua New Guinea, Samoa and in Australia, where it has been Western Australia, Queensland and northern New South Wales.

The wingspan is about 20 mm. The forewings are white with a brown pattern. Both the forewings and hindwings have a white margin.

The larvae feed on the leaves of Ficus species, including Ficus coronata, Ficus macrophylla and Ficus opposita. They feed from within a shelter made of leaves joined by silk.

References

Moths described in 1866
Spilomelinae
Moths of Asia
Moths of Australia